The House at 215 Brookline Street is one of the oldest houses in Newton, Massachusetts. The oldest portion of the saltbox house was built ca. 1693 by Thomas Hastings, who was prominent in the civic affairs of the area. The house uncharacteristically faces north (typical period houses faced south) and exhibits simple but high-quality Georgian styling. It is 2½ stories in height, five bays in width, and has narrow clapboard siding. The main entrance is flanked by pilasters and topped by a shallow hood.

The house was listed on the National Register of Historic Places in 1986.

See also
List of the oldest buildings in Massachusetts
National Register of Historic Places listings in Newton, Massachusetts

References

Houses on the National Register of Historic Places in Newton, Massachusetts
Georgian architecture in Massachusetts
Houses completed in 1693
1693 establishments in Massachusetts